Jik-e Sofla (also Romanized as Jīk-e Soflá and Jīg-e Soflá; also known as Jīk, Jirag, Jīrak, and Jirg) is a village in Naharjan Rural District, Mud District, Sarbisheh County, South Khorasan Province, Iran. In the 2006 census, its population was 70 people across 21 families.

References 

Populated places in Sarbisheh County